Charles Wickham LaRue (August 1, 1922 Texas – November 1, 2006 Irvine, California) was an American trombonist and jazz arranger who played with Tommy Dorsey in 1946–47, appearing in The Fabulous Dorseys film. He also played with Tommy Pederson's big band, among others. Later in life, he was one of the founders of Bones West.

He attended the University of North Texas College of Music in the early 1940s where he was a member of the Aces of Collegeland.  He earned his bachelor's degree decades later in 1994 from California State University, Fullerton.

References

American jazz trombonists
Male trombonists
Swing trombonists
American jazz composers
American male jazz composers
American music arrangers
University of North Texas College of Music alumni
Jazz arrangers
California State University, Fullerton alumni
1922 births
2006 deaths
20th-century trombonists
20th-century American composers
20th-century American male musicians
20th-century jazz composers